is a Japanese professional sumo wrestler from Tokorozawa, Saitama. His debut in maezumō was in March 2015, and his first makuuchi division honbasho was the Kyūshū tournament in November 2016. His highest rank has been komusubi. He has seven kinboshi or gold stars for a defeat of a yokozuna and two special prizes for Technique.

Career

Early career

He was a high school yokozuna at Saitama Sakae High School (also the alma mater of Gōeidō) and won multiple major amateur champions before his senior year at Nippon Sport Science University. If he had entered professional sumo in either of those years he would have started as a makushita tsukedashi and skipped the lower divisions, but his parents wanted him to complete his education. So instead he made his debut in March 2015 at the maezumō level. He was unable to compete under his family name of Nakamura as that was already taken by Nakamura Oyakata (former sekiwake Kotonishiki), so instead he used his given name, Daiki. He rose up the ranks quickly, winning the yūshō or tournament championships in the jonidan and sandanme divisions with perfect 7-0 records. He became a sekitori upon reaching the jūryō division in July 2016, and he won the jūryō championship in September with a 12–3 record, which saw him promoted to the top makuuchi division. His rise to the top division in ten tournaments was the second fastest of modern times behind that of Jōkōryū who achieved the feat in nine tournaments in 2012. At this point he changed his shikona from Daiki to Hokutofuji, which was derived from the shikona of his stablemaster, former yokozuna Hokutoumi, and Hokutoumi's own stablemaster, former yokozuna Kitanofuji.

Makuuchi career
Hokutofuji came through with a solid 9–6 record in his top division debut and recorded 9 wins again in January 2017. In March he recorded the first make-koshi (losing record) of his career, but a 10–5 result in May saw him move up the rankings. In the July 2017 tournament he earned a kinboshi or gold star in his first ever match against a yokozuna, defeating Kakuryū,  and finished with eight wins. On Day 4 of the September tournament he beat yokozuna Harumafuji to claim his second kinboshi. He was a runner-up to Hakuhō in the November 2017 tournament with an 11–4 record, and was awarded his first special prize, for Technique. He also defeated yokozuna Kisenosato in this tournament, earning his third kinboshi in his last three tournaments. In January 2018 he won a fourth straight kinboshi by defeating Hakuhō on Day 3, but he finished the tournament with only four wins against eleven losses. In the May 2018 tournament he suffered a concussion during a false start at the tachi-ai in his match against Ryūden on Day 10. He withdrew from the rest of the tournament. Returning in July ranked at the bottom of the division at maegashira 16, he secured a winning record.

In March 2019 he made his sanyaku debut at komusubi rank. He was the third komusubi from Saitama Prefecture after Wakabayama in September 1951 and Wakachichibu in March 1959. He is also the fourth komusubi from Hakkaku stable following Kaiho, Hokutoriki and Okinoumi. In September 2019 he picked up his sixth kinboshi by defeating Hakuhō on the opening day. Following this victory he lost his next six matches to fall to 1-6 but made an impressive recovery by winning his final 8 matches to finish the tournament at 9-6. He returned to the komusubi rank in November, one of four komusubi in that tournament, but fell just short of a majority of wins with a 7–8 record. Back in the maegashira ranks in January 2020 he earned his seventh kinboshi by defeating Kakuryū on Day 3. He also beat both , and finished the tournament with eleven wins and his second Technique Prize. He returned to the  rank in March, and defeated Kakuryū again on Day 2, but finished the tournament with a 4–11 record. He has remained in the  ranks since July 2020, and has alternated between winning and losing records for 16 straight tournaments up until May 2022. He was forced to withdraw from the July tournament on the final day due to COVID-19 protocols, although he already had a losing record by that point. In September he was the tournament leader after winning his first nine matches, but he lost five of his last six matches to finish with a 10–5 record.

Fighting style
Hokutofuji's performances to date suggest that he is an oshi-sumo specialist who favours pushing techniques to fighting on the mawashi or belt. He wins roughly half his bouts with a straightforward oshi-dashi, or push out.

Family
Hokutofuji is married, and the couple's first child was born in March 2021.

Career record

See also
List of sumo tournament top division runners-up
List of sumo tournament second division champions
Glossary of sumo terms
List of active sumo wrestlers
List of active gold star earners
List of komusubi
Active special prize winners

References

External links
 

1992 births
Living people
Japanese sumo wrestlers
Sumo people from Saitama Prefecture
Nippon Sport Science University alumni
People from Tokorozawa, Saitama